Jennifer Gray (born 30 April 1993) is an Irish former cricketer who played as a right-handed batter and occasional right-arm medium bowler. She appeared in 9 One Day Internationals and 7 Twenty20 Internationals for Ireland between 2014 and 2018. She played domestic cricket for all three of the Women's Super Series teams.

References

External links

1993 births
Living people
Cricketers from County Dublin
Irish women cricketers
Ireland women One Day International cricketers
Ireland women Twenty20 International cricketers
Dragons (women's cricket) cricketers
Typhoons (women's cricket) cricketers
Scorchers (women's cricket) cricketers